Bhaluka Road railway station is a railway station on the Howrah–New Jalpaiguri line of Katihar railway division of Northeast Frontier Railway Zone. It is situated at Kariali, Kariali of Malda district in the Indian state of West Bengal. Total 24 passengers and express trains stop at Bhaluka Road railway station.

References

Railway stations in Malda district
Katihar railway division